The Miyazaki Phoenix League is a fall baseball league organized by Nippon Professional Baseball consisting of minor league affiliates of NPB teams, minor league affiliates of Korea Professional Baseball teams, and a team representing the Shikoku Island League Plus.

External links
Official Site (Japanese)

3
4
Professional sports leagues in Japan
Multi-national professional sports leagues
Baseball competitions in South Korea
Sports leagues in South Korea